Elections to the French National Assembly were held in French Sudan on 17 June 1951 as part of the wider French parliamentary elections. Four members were elected, with the Sudanese Progressive Party winning three (taken by Fily Dabo Sissoko, Jean Silvandre and Hamadoun Dicko) and the Sudanese Union – African Democratic Rally one (Mamadou Konaté).

Results

References

1951 in French Sudan
Elections in Mali
French Sudan
French Sudan
Election and referendum articles with incomplete results